Byzantine rhetoric refers to rhetorical theorizing and production during the time of the Byzantine Empire.  Byzantine rhetoric is significant in part because of the sheer volume of rhetorical works produced during this period.  Rhetoric was the most important and difficult topic studied in the Byzantine education system, beginning at the Pandidakterion in early fifth century Constantinople, where the school emphasized the study of rhetoric with eight teaching chairs, five in Greek and three in Latin.  The hard training of Byzantine rhetoric provided skills and credentials for citizens to attain public office in the imperial service, or posts of authority within the Church.

Influences 
The Byzantine rhetoric of the Byzantine Empire followed largely the precepts of ancient Greek rhetoricians, especially those belonging to the Second Sophistic, including Hermogenes of Tarsus, Menander Rhetor, Aphthonius of Antioch, Libanius, and Alexander Numenius.

History 
Thomas M. Conley divides the history of Byzantine rhetoric into four periods: The Dark Ages, After Iconoclasm, 11th and 12th Centuries, and the Paleologan Era.

The Dark Ages 
This period includes the formation of the Hermogenean corpus and associated commentary traditions.  These include Sopater of Apamea and Syrianus's commentaries of Hermogenes.  Some commentaries compare rhetoric with philosophy.

After Iconoclasm 
After the Iconoclasm, Byzantine scholars collected manuscripts of Greek rhetoricians such as Dionysius of Halicarnassus, Menander Rhetor, and Alexander Numenius. Some important Byzantine figures from this period include Photius, John Geometres, and John of Sardis.

11th and 12th Centuries 
This is the period of the Comnenan emperors.  Important Byzantine figures from this period include Michael Psellus, Nikephoros Basilakes, Gregory Pardos of Corinth, and Euthymios Zigabenos.  This period includes important epideictic speeches for the emperor called basilikoi logoi, many of which compare emperors to King David.

The Paleologan Era 
This is the period of the Paleologan emperors.  The influence of the Latin administration prompted translations of Latin works into Greek and a reluctant return to Aristotle.  Important Byzantine figures include Theodore Metochites, Maximus Planudes, Nikephoras Choumnos, George Gemistius Plethon, and George of Trebizond.  Theodore Metochites and Nikephoras Choumnos are known for their debates over the value of stylistic obscurity.  George of Trebizond is known for introducing Hermogenes to the West; his works contribute to the development of Renaissance rhetoric.

See also
 Byzantine university
 Greek Scholars in the Renaissance
 Rhetoric

References

Further reading 

 V. Regel and N. Novosadskij (1892-1917). Fontes rerum byzantinarum. 
 R. Browning (1962). "The Patriarchal Schools of Constantinople," Byzantion 32, pp. 167-202; 33 (1963), pp. 11-40.
 G. Kustas (1970). "The Function and Evolution of Byzantine Rhetoric," Viator 1, pp. 53-73.
 G. Kustas (1973). Studies in Byzantine Rhetoric.
 J. Monfasani (1976). George of Trebizond: A Biography and a Study of His Rhetoric and Logic. 
 H. Hunger (1978). Die hochsprachliche profane Literatur der Byzantiner, vol. 1, pp. 65-196.
 A. Kazhdan (1984). Studies on Byzantine Literature of the Eleventh and Twelfth Centuries.
 T.M. Conley (1990). “Aristotle’s Rhetoric in Byzantium,” Rhetorica 8, pp. 29-44.
 E. Jeffreys (2003). Rhetoric in Byzantium.
 S. Papaioannou (2012).  “Rhetoric and the philosopher in Byzantium,” in B. Bydén and K. Ierodiakonou (eds), The Many Faces of Byzantine Philosophy, pp. 171-97.
 S. Papaioannou (2013). Michael Psellos: Rhetoric and Authorship in Byzantium.
 V. Valiavitcharska (2013). Rhetoric and Rhythm in Byzantium: The Sound of Persuasion.
 V. Valiavitcharska (2013). “Rhetoric in the Hands of the Byzantine Grammarian,” Rhetorica 31, pp. 237-60.
 C. Barber and S. Papaioannou (2017). Michael Psellos on Literature and Art: a Byzantine Perspective on Aesthetics.
 P. Magdalino (2017). “From ‘Encyclopaedism’ to ‘Humanism’,” in M.D. Lauxtermann and M. Whittow (eds), Byzantium in the Eleventh Century, pp. 3-18.
 V. Valiavitcharska (2018). “Aristotle’s antistrophos in Middle Byzantine Accounts of Rhetoric," in Reshaping the Classical Tradition in Byzantine Texts and Contexts. Ed. D. Dimitrijevic, A. Elakovic-Nenadovic, and J. Sijakovic. Belgrade: Faculty of Law of the University of Belgrade.
 M. Vogiatzi (2019). Byzantine Commentaries on Aristotle’s Rhetoric: Anonymous and Stephanus.
 V. Valiavitcharska (2020). “The Advanced Study of Rhetoric Between the Seventh and the Ninth Centuries," in Jahrbuch der Österreichischen Byzantinistik. Austrian Academy of Sciences. Band 70, pp. 487-50.
 V. Valiavitcharska (2021). “Logos prophorikos in Middle Byzantine Thought," in Studia Patristica. Journal of the Oxford International Conference on Patristic Studies. Vol. 103.

Byzantine culture
Rhetoric